The girls' 4 × 100 metre medley relay event at the 2018 Summer Youth Olympics took place on 8 October at the Natatorium in Buenos Aires, Argentina.

Results

Final
The final was held at 19:29.

References

Swimming at the 2018 Summer Youth Olympics